Tre Vänner Produktion AB was a Swedish production company that makes television programs, movies and commercials. The company was founded in 1995 by screenwriter Michael Hjorth, Johan Kindblom, and Tomas Tivemark. The owners are originally screenwriter and has created the series Svensson, Svensson, Cleo, and Mannen som log. The company has also produced several television episodes of several TV series, such as Världarnas bok, Poliser, and Ett gott parti, the films 7 miljonärer, Ett öga rött, Kid Svensk, and the series Det okända.

Tre Vänner has also produced the 2010 film Easy Money, which is a film adaptation Jens Lapidus' novel with the same name. They have also been advertising the grocery chain ICA and Swedbank. In addition, the company has also created a wholly owned production company, along with Camilla Läckberg produced ten 1.5-hour-long TV episodes named Fjällbackamorden.

In 2013, the company was bought by Svensk Filmindustri, and later merged to create the new studio SF Studios in 2016.

External links 
Official website

 
Television production companies of Sweden
Mass media companies established in 1995
Film production companies of Sweden
1995 establishments in Sweden